{{DISPLAYTITLE:C2H4N4}}
The molecular formula C2H4N4 (molar mass: 84.08 g/mol, exact mass: 84.0436 u) may refer to:

 3-Amino-1,2,4-triazole (3-AT), a herbicide
 2-Cyanoguanidine